Francis John Blatherwick, CM, OBC, CD, FRCP(C) (born September 11, 1944) was one of Canada's trailblazing leaders in public health and was the longest-serving Medical officer of health in Canada when he retired in 2007.

Entry into public health

Prior to coming to Vancouver, he was the Medical Health Officer in the Simon Fraser Health Unit for nine years. He received his MD from the University of Alberta in 1969.  He then started in public health when he left a residency in Internal Medicine at Vancouver General Hospital in 1971 to set up the Pine Street Youth Clinic. He received his Diploma in Public Health at the University of Toronto in 1975 and completed his Fellowship in Public Health at University of British Columbia in 1976.

Public health leadership

Blatherwick served as the Medical Health Officer or Chief Medical Health Officer in Vancouver, British Columbia from 1984 to 2007. As the medical health officer for the Vancouver Coastal Health Authority, he has been the moving force behind a number of important programs, especially those involving youth, people with disabilities, people living with AIDS, combating drug addictions, and the move to abolish smoking in the workplace.

Blatherwick became skilled at media relations and was well known for voicing independent, authoritative opinions on controversial health issues. Premier Bill Vander Zalm publicly threatened to fire him – twice – over his advocacy for condoms and sex education in schools. Insite, the first legal supervised safe injection site in North America, opened during his tenure.

He also led Vancouver's public health response to the SARS epidemic.

Armed forces

Blatherwick served in the Canadian Forces reserves for 39 years, retiring in 2000 with the rank of Commander
and the position of Senior Naval Reserve Medical Advisor. He served in the Air Force, Army, and the Naval reserves, and was Canada's representative to the NATO Reserve Medical Officers’ Congress from 1989 to 1995.

He is currently the Honorary Colonel for 12 (Vancouver) Field Ambulance (2006 to 2012).

Health-related publications 
 Vancouver's Needle Exchange Program, By John Bardsley, John Turvey and John Blatherwick, Canadian Journal of Public Health (1990), Vol. 81, pp. 39–45 ISSN 0008-4263

Books authored 
Blatherwick has written more than 20 books, mostly on medals and flying:
 Royal Canadian Air Force Honours, Decorations, Medals, 1920–1968, By John Blatherwick, 1991, FJB Air Publications.
 A History of Airlines in Canada By Francis John Blatherwick, 1989, Unitrade Press, 
 Canadian Orders, Decorations, and Medals, By Francis John Blatherwick, 1983, Unitrade Press
 1000 Brave Canadians: The Canadian Gallantry Awards, 1854–1989, By Francis John Blatherwick, 1991, Unitrade Press

Honours
 3 May 1995 - Member of the Order of Canada (CM).
 1979 – Order of St. John of Jerusalem, Officer 1984, Commander 1989
 2007 – Member of the Order of British Columbia (OBC), upon his retirement.
 Special Service Medal with "NATO-OTAN" Clasp
 1967 - Canadian Centennial Medal
 1977 - Queen Elizabeth II Silver Jubilee Medal (Canadian Version)
 1992 – 125th Anniversary of the Confederation of Canada Medal
 2002 – Queen Elizabeth II Golden Jubilee Medal (Canadian Version)
 2012 – Queen Elizabeth II Diamond Jubilee Medal (Canadian Version)
 Canadian Forces Decoration with 3 Clasps (CD)
 Service Medal of the Order of St John with 1 Silver Bar
 2002 – named Canadian Health Hero from the Pan American Health Organization
 2005 – Silver Medal of Service from the British Columbia Medical Association

References 

 Trailblazing doctor to retire: Public health took precedence over prudery, politics, business, By Don Harrison, The Province, Published May 29, 2007
 Blatherwick looking to spend time with family, By Kelly Sinoski, Vancouver Sun, Published May 29, 2007
 From SARS to salmonella, health officer never backed down, By Mark Hume, The Globe and Mail, Published May 29, 2007
 CANADA’S LONGEST-SERVING MEDICAL HEALTH OFFICER RETIRES, news release, Vancouver Coastal Health, May 28, 2007
 

1944 births
Aviation writers
Living people
Canadian military historians
Canadian male non-fiction writers
20th-century Canadian civil servants
Canadian public health doctors
Commanders of the Order of St John
Members of the Order of Canada
Members of the Order of British Columbia
Writers from Vancouver
University of Alberta alumni
University of British Columbia alumni
University of Toronto alumni
21st-century Canadian civil servants